The men's 400 metres hurdles at the 2011 Asian Athletics Championships was held at the Kobe Universiade Memorial Stadium on the 8 and 9 of July.

Medalists

Records

Round 1
First 3 in each heat (Q) and 2 best performers (q) advanced to the Final.

Final

References

400 metres hurdles
400 metres hurdles at the Asian Athletics Championships